Arrhopalitidae is a family of springtails belonging to the order Symphypleona.

Genera 
Arrhopalitidae includes the following genera:

 Arrhopalites Börner, 1906
 Pygmarrhopalites Vargovitsh, 2009
 Troglopalites Vargovitsh, 2012

References

External links 
 

Collembola
Arthropod families